The 2008–09 Rugby Pro D2 was the second-level French rugby union club competition, behind the Top 14, in the 2008–09 season. It ran alongside the 2008–09 Top 14 competition; both competitions were operated by the Ligue Nationale de Rugby (LNR).

Previous season
At the end of the previous season, Toulon were champions and thus automatically promoted to Top 14. They were eventually followed by Mont-de-Marsan, who beat Racing Métro in extra time in the final providing the second promotion place. Blagnac, which had been newly promoted to Pro D2 for the 2007–08 season, finished bottom of the table and were initially relegated to Fédérale 1, but were further relegated by French sporting authorities to Fédérale 2 due to financial problems. Limoges finished second-from-bottom for the second consecutive year; unlike 2006–07, when Limoges were reprieved when Gaillac were denied a professional license due to financial issues, they received no such break in 2007–08. The other promoted team in 2007–08, Aurillac, stayed up, finishing in 11th.

Colomiers and Bourg-en-Bresse earned promotion from Fédérale 1 for the 2008–09 season, while Albi and Auch were relegated from the 2007–08 Top 14.

2008–09 synopsis
Racing Métro, which had barely missed out on promotion the previous season, easily won the title, clinching with three rounds to spare. The three promotion playoff games were decided by a total of 5 points, with the semifinal between Albi and La Rochelle being tied after extra time and decided on the third step of the tiebreaker, penalties scored during the match. Albi ultimately defeated Oyonnax in the final to secure an immediate return to the Top 14.

The two newly promoted teams, Colomiers and Bourg-en-Bresse, were in relegation trouble throughout the season, but Colomiers escaped, finishing in 14th, the last safe spot. Bourg-en-Bresse were provisionally joined in relegation by Béziers.

However, this did not end the relegation saga. In order to keep a professional license and stay in Pro D2, all clubs must pass a postseason audit conducted by DNACG (Direction nationale d'aide et de contrôle de gestion), the LNR's financial arm. On June 12, DNACG announced that Tarbes and Bourg-en-Bresse had failed their audits and would be relegated. Tarbes would be relegated to Fédérale 1, while Bourg-en-Bresse, already consigned to Fédérale 1, would face a further drop to Fédérale 2. Béziers would have been spared the drop if Tarbes had not successfully appealed its relegation. However, Tarbes were able to come up with sufficient financial guarantees to satisfy DNACG, and its relegation to Fédérale 1 was officially rescinded on June 26.

The competition
The LNR uses a slightly different bonus points system from that used in most other rugby competitions. It trialled a new system in 2007–08 explicitly designed to prevent a losing team from earning more than one bonus point in a match, a system that also makes it impossible for either team to earn a bonus point in a drawn match. LNR chose to continue with this system for 2008–09.

France's bonus point system operates as follows:

 4 points for a win.
 2 points for a draw.
 1 "bonus" point for winning while scoring at least 3 more tries than the opponent. This replaces the standard bonus point for scoring 4 tries regardless of the match result.
 1 "bonus" point for losing by 7 points (or less).

Season table

{| class="wikitable" width="450px" style="float:left; font-size:95%; margin-left:15px;"
| colspan="2"  style="text-align:center; background:#fff;" cellpadding="0" cellspacing="0"|Key to colors
|-
| style="background: #3fff00;" |     
|Champions automatically promoted to Top 14
|-
| style="background: #fde910;" |     
|Winner of playoffs between second- through fifth-place teams for the second promotion place
|-
| style="background:#ccf;"|     
|Remaining participants in promotion playoffs
|-
| style="background: #ff79B4;" |     
|Bottom two teams are relegated to Fédérale 1.
|}

Schedule and results
Matches are listed in the following order:
 By date.
 If matches are held on the same day, by kickoff time.
 Otherwise, in alphabetic order of home club.

All times CET.

Rounds 1 to 5
Round 1
 6 September, 18:30 — Aurillac 11 - 6 (1 BP) Albi
 6 September, 18:30 — Béziers 15 - 15 Pau
 6 September, 18:30 — Grenoble (1 BP) 31 - 6 Colomiers
 6 September, 18:30 — La Rochelle 30 - 12 Oyonnax
 6 September, 18:30 — Lyon 18 - 9 Racing Métro
 6 September, 18:30 — Narbonne 6 - 6 Tarbes
 7 September, 15:00 — Bourg-en-Bresse (1 BP) 18 - 25 Bordeaux-Bègles
 7 September, 15:15 — Agen 30 - 16 Auch

Round 2
 13 September, 18:30 — Albi 26 - 19 (1 BP) Grenoble
 13 September, 18:30 — Auch 21 - 16 (1 BP) Narbonne
 13 September, 18:30 — Bordeaux-Bègles 24 - 12 Béziers
 13 September, 18:30 — Colomiers 20 - 6 Lyon
 13 September, 18:30 — Pau 27 - 15 Agen
 13 September, 18:30 — Tarbes (1 BP) 15 - 16 Aurillac
 14 September, 15:00 — Racing Métro 12 - 9 (1 BP) La Rochelle
 14 September, 16:00 — Oyonnax (1 BP) 38 - 8 Bourg-en-Bresse

Round 3
 20 September, 18:30 — Agen 26 - 19 (1 BP) Oyonnax
 20 September, 18:30 — Aurillac (1 BP) 49 - 19 Bordeaux-Bègles
 20 September, 18:30 — La Rochelle 15 - 12 (1 BP) Auch
 20 September, 18:30 — Lyon (1 BP) 56 - 3 Tarbes
 20 September, 18:30 — Narbonne 16 - 25 Racing Métro
 21 September, 15:00 — Bourg-en-Bresse (1 BP) 12 - 18 Albi
 21 September, 15:00 — Grenoble 22 - 9 Pau
 21 September, 15:15 — Colomiers (1 BP) 38 - 17 Béziers

Round 4
 27 September, 18:30 — Albi 28 - 22 (1 BP) Narbonne
 27 September, 18:30 — Auch 24 - 6 Bourg-en-Bresse
 27 September, 18:30 — Bordeaux-Bègles (1 BP) 22 - 23 La Rochelle
 27 September, 18:30 — Oyonnax 22 - 15 (1 BP) Lyon
 27 September, 18:30 — Pau 30 - 23 (1 BP) Colomiers
 27 September, 18:30 — Racing Métro (1 BP) 35 - 16 Aurillac
 27 September, 18:30 — Tarbes 34 - 24 Agen
 28 September, 15:15 — Béziers 16 - 25 Grenoble

Round 5
 4 October, 18:30 — Agen (1 BP) 14 - 17 Bordeaux-Bègles
 4 October, 18:30 — Aurillac 30 - 26 (1 BP) Oyonnax
 4 October, 18:30 — Béziers 22 - 19 (1 BP) Auch
 4 October, 18:30 — Colomiers 15 - 15 Narbonne
 4 October, 18:30 — Grenoble (1 BP)10 - 16 Racing Métro
 4 October, 18:30 — Lyon (1 BP) 15 - 22 (1 BP) Albi
 5 October, 15:00 — Bourg-en-Bresse 22 - 16 (1 BP) Tarbes
 5 October, 15:15 — La Rochelle 18 - 14 (1 BP) Pau

Rounds 6 to 10
Round 6
 18 October, 18:30 — Agen (1 BP) 62 - 9 Bourg-en-Bresse
 18 October, 18:30 — Albi 29 - 22 (1 BP) La Rochelle
 18 October, 18:30 — Auch 15 - 9 (1 BP) Grenoble
 18 October, 18:30 — Narbonne 26 - 17 Bordeaux-Bègles
 18 October, 18:30 — Oyonnax 16 - 3 Pau
 18 October, 18:30 — Racing Métro (1 BP) 37 - 9 Béziers
 18 October, 18:30 — Tarbes 25 - 10 Colomiers
 19 October, 14:00 — Lyon 19 - 13 (1 BP) Aurillac

Round 7
 25 October, 18:30 — Béziers 9 - 30 (1 BP) Oyonnax
 25 October, 18:30 — Grenoble 23 - 19 (1 BP) Tarbes
 25 October, 18:30 — La Rochelle (1 BP) 23 - 18 (1 BP) Lyon
 25 October, 18:30 — Narbonne 25 - 22 (1 BP) Agen
 25 October, 18:30 — Pau 16 - 15 (1 BP) Racing Métro
 26 October, 15:00 — Bourg-en-Bresse 11 - 20 Aurillac
 26 October, 15:00 — Colomiers 24 - 15 Auch
 26 October, 15:15 — Bordeaux-Bègles 19 - 6 Albi

Round 8
 1 November, 18:30 — Agen 18 - 12 (1 BP) Grenoble
 1 November, 18:30 — Auch 17 - 12 (1 BP) Pau
 1 November, 18:30 — Aurillac (1 BP) 31 - 9 Narbonne
 1 November, 18:30 — La Rochelle (1 BP) 56 - 18 Bourg-en-Bresse
 1 November, 18:30 — Lyon 12 - 10 (1 BP) Béziers
 1 November, 18:30 — Oyonnax 16 - 16 Albi
 1 November, 18:30 — Tarbes 31 - 15 Bordeaux
 2 November, 16:45 — Racing Métro 9 - 8 (1 BP) Colomiers

Round 9
 8 November, 18:30 — Albi 30 - 20 Colomiers
 8 November, 18:30 — Aurillac 25 - 19 (1 BP) La Rochelle
 8 November, 18:30 — Bordeaux-Bègles (1 BP) 14 - 18 Pau
 8 November, 18:30 — Grenoble 21 - 20 (1 BP) Lyon
 8 November, 18:30 — Narbonne 22 - 21 (1 BP) Bourg-en-Bresse
 8 November, 18:30 — Oyonnax 25 - 9 Auch
 8 November, 18:30 — Tarbes (1 BP) 16 - 23 Racing Métro
 9 November, 15:15 — Béziers 21 - 16 (1 BP) Agen

Round 10
 15 November, 18:30 — Agen 19 - 16 (1 BP) La Rochelle
 15 November, 18:30 — Albi 18 - 12 (1 BP) Tarbes
 15 November, 18:30 — Auch 15 - 5 Bordeaux-Bègles
 15 November, 18:30 — Colomiers 15 - 30 (1 BP) Aurillac
 15 November, 18:30 — Pau 21 - 16 (1 BP) Lyon
 15 November, 18:30 — Racing Métro 31 - 20 Oyonnax
 16 November, 15:00 — Bourg-en-Bresse 9 - 3 (1 BP) Béziers
 16 November, 15:15 — Narbonne 6 - 3 (1 BP) Grenoble

Rounds 11 to 15
Round 11
 29 November, 18:30 — Agen 36 - 17 Colomiers
 29 November, 18:30 — Aurillac 29 - 22 (1 BP) Grenoble
 29 November, 18:30 — Bordeaux-Bègles 15 - 9 (1 BP) Oyonnax
 29 November, 18:30 — La Rochelle (1 BP) 33 - 9 Béziers
 29 November, 18:30 — Lyon 14 - 13 (1 BP) Narbonne
 29 November, 18:30 — Pau 22 - 9 Bourg-en-Bresse
 30 November, 15:15 — Tarbes 26 - 12 Auch
 30 November, 16:30 — Racing Métro (1 BP) 36 - 17 Albi

Round 12
 6 December, 18:30 — Albi 16 - 13 (1 BP) Pau
 6 December, 18:30 — Béziers 25 - 16 Aurillac
 6 December, 18:30 — Bordeaux-Bègles 33 - 12 Colomiers
 6 December, 18:30 — Grenoble 12 - 12 Bourg-en-Bresse
 6 December, 18:30 — Lyon (1 BP) 12 - 13 Agen
 6 December, 18:30 — Narbonne 33 - 16 La Rochelle
 6 December, 18:30 — Oyonnax 12 - 6 (1 BP) Tarbes
 7 December, 15:15 — Auch 22 - 18 (1 BP) Racing Métro

Round 13
 13 December, 18:30 — Albi 20 - 14 (1 BP) Auch
 13 December, 18:30 — Aurillac (1 BP) 16 - 20 Agen
 13 December, 18:30 — Colomiers 24 - 16 (1 BP) Oyonnax
 13 December, 18:30 — Pau (1 BP) 33 - 3 Narbonne
 13 December, 18:30 — Racing Métro (1 BP) 22 - 6 Bordeaux-Bègles
 13 December, 18:30 — Tarbes 23 - 10 Béziers
 14 December, 14:30 — Grenoble 14 - 6 La Rochelle
 14 December, 15:00 — Bourg-en-Bresse (1 BP) 18 - 23 Lyon

Round 14
 20 December, 18:30 — Auch 11 - 9 (1 BP) Aurillac
 20 December, 18:30 — La Rochelle (1 BP) 32 - 9 Colomiers
 20 December, 18:30 — Narbonne (1 BP) 34 - 8 Béziers
 20 December, 18:30 — Oyonnax 9 - 3 (1 BP) Grenoble
 20 December, 18:30 — Pau 12 - 11 (1 BP) Tarbes
 21 December, 14:30 — Bourg-en-Bresse (1 BP) 10 - 17 Racing Métro
 21 December, 15:00 — Bordeaux-Bègles 28 - 37 (1 BP) Lyon
 21 December, 15:15 — Agen 20 - 8 Albi

Round 15

 10 January, 18:30 — Béziers 21 - 21 Albi
 10 January, 18:30 — Colomiers 13 - 3 Bourg-en-Bresse
 10 January, 18:30 — Grenoble 13 - 12 (1 BP) Bordeaux-Bègles
 10 January, 18:30 — Tarbes (1 BP) 10 - 12 La Rochelle
 11 January, 15:00 — Oyonnax (1 BP) 42 - 17 Narbonne
 11 January, 15:15 — Lyon 9 - 3 (1 BP) Auch
 14 February, 18:30 — Aurillac 13 - 22 Pau
 15 February, 14:00 — Racing Métro 32 - 28 (1 BP) Agen

Rounds 16 to 20
Round 16
 17 January, 18:30 — Auch 12 - 20 Agen
 17 January, 18:30 — Bordeaux-Bègles (1 BP) 45 - 12 Bourg-en-Bresse
 17 January, 18:30 — Oyonnax 18 - 12 (1 BP) La Rochelle
 17 January, 18:30 — Pau 27 - 14 Béziers
 17 January, 18:30 — Tarbes 27 - 8 Narbonne
 18 January, 14:15 — Albi (1 BP) 28 - 12 Aurillac
 18 January, 15:00 — Colomiers 12 - 6 (1 BP) Grenoble
 18 January, 15:00 — Racing Métro (1 BP) 30 - 6 Lyon

Round 17
 24 January, 18:30 — La Rochelle 22 - 11 Racing Métro
 24 January, 18:30 — Lyon 9 - 9 Colomiers
 25 January, 14:30 — Agen 28 - 14 Pau
 25 January, 15:00 — Aurillac 17 - 37 Tarbes
 25 January, 15:00 — Béziers 18 - 12 (1 BP) Bordeaux-Bègles
 25 January, 15:00 — Bourg-en-Bresse (1 BP) 3 - 9 Oyonnax
 25 January, 15:00 — Grenoble (1 BP) 9 - 13 Albi
 25 January, 15:30 — Narbonne (1 BP) 6 - 13 Auch

Round 18
 31 January, 18:30 — Albi (1 BP) 31 - 18 Bourg-en-Bresse
 31 January, 18:30 — Auch (1 BP) 5 - 6 La Rochelle
 31 January, 18:30 — Béziers 12 - 6 (1 BP) Colomiers
 31 January, 18:30 — Pau 9 - 8 (1 BP) Grenoble
 31 January, 18:30 — Tarbes 19 - 16 (1 BP) Lyon
 1 February, 14:45 — Oyonnax 19 - 3 Agen
 1 February, 15:00 — Racing Métro (1 BP) 37 - 10 Narbonne
 1 February, 15:15 — Bordeaux-Bègles 29 - 18 Aurillac

Round 19
 7 February, 15:00 — Narbonne 10 - 9 (1 BP) Albi
 7 February, 16:00 — Grenoble 12 - 8 (1 BP) Béziers
 7 February, 16:00 — Lyon 9 - 6 (1 BP) Oyonnax
 8 February, 15:00 — Agen (1 BP) 45 - 23 Tarbes
 8 February, 15:00 — Bourg-en-Bresse (1 BP) 36 - 0 Auch
 8 February, 15:00 — Colomiers 18 - 13 (1 BP) Pau
 8 February, 15:00 — La Rochelle (1 BP) 13 -16  Bordeaux-Bègles
 8 February, 17:15 — Aurillac 16 - 35 Racing Métro

Round 20

 21 February, 18:30 — Albi 19 - 13 (1 BP) Lyon
 21 February, 18:30 — Auch (1 BP) 32 - 8 Béziers
 21 February, 18:30 — Bordeaux-Bègles 37 - 28 Agen
 21 February, 18:30 — Narbonne 37 - 24 Colomiers
 21 February, 18:30 — Oyonnax (1 BP) 34 - 7 Aurillac
 21 February, 18:30 — Tarbes (1 BP) 59 - 9 Bourg-en-Bresse
 22 February, 15:00 — Racing Métro 15 - 7 Grenoble
 22 February, 15:15 — Pau 20 - 19 (1 BP) La Rochelle

Rounds 21 to 25
Round 21
 28 February, 18:30 — Aurillac 18 - 9 Lyon
 28 February, 18:30 — Béziers 19 - 51 (1 BP) Racing Métro
 28 February, 18:30 — Bordeaux-Bègles 26 - 22 Narbonne
 28 February, 18:30 — Colomiers 20 - 16 (1 BP) Tarbes
 28 February, 18:30 — Grenoble 26 - 3 Auch
 28 February, 18:30 — Pau 15 - 12 (1 BP) Oyonnax
 1 March, 15:00 — Bourg-en-Bresse 18 - 65 (1 BP) Agen
 1 March, 15:15 — La Rochelle 19 - 16 (1 BP) Albi

Round 22
 7 March, 18:30 — Agen 20 - 6 Narbonne
 7 March, 18:30 — Albi 20 - 17 (1 BP) Bordeaux-Bègles
 7 March, 18:30 — Auch 17 - 12 (1 BP) Colomiers
 7 March, 18:30 — Aurillac 23 - 17 (1 BP) Bourg-en-Bresse
 7 March, 18:30 — Lyon 27 - 12 La Rochelle
 7 March, 18:30 — Racing Métro 28 - 10 Pau
 7 March, 18:30 — Tarbes 10 - 3 (1 BP) Grenoble
 8 March, 15:45 — Oyonnax (1 BP) 35 - 6 Béziers

Round 23
 14 March, 18:30 — Béziers 17 - 56 (1 BP) Lyon
 14 March, 18:30 — Bordeaux-Bègles 12 - 27 Tarbes
 14 March, 18:30 — Colomiers 19 - 27 Racing Métro
 14 March, 18:30 — Grenoble (1 BP) 16 - 20 Agen
 14 March, 18:30 — Narbonne 23 - 23 Aurillac
 14 March, 18:30 — Pau 25 - 14 Auch
 15 March, 14:00 — Albi 30 - 13 Oyonnax
 15 March, 15:00 — Bourg-en-Bresse 20 - 38 (1 BP) La Rochelle

Round 24
 21 March, 18:30 — Agen (1 BP) 51 - 16 Béziers
 21 March, 18:30 — Auch 15 - 12 (1 BP) Oyonnax
 21 March, 18:30 — La Rochelle 33 - 19 Aurillac
 21 March, 18:30 — Pau (1 BP) 22 - 27 Bordeaux-Bègles
 21 March, 18:30 — Racing Métro 25 - 16 Tarbes
 22 March, 15:00 — Bourg-en-Bresse 24 - 16 Narbonne
 22 March, 15:00 — Colomiers (1 BP) 31 - 37 Albi
 22 March, 15:15 — Lyon (1 BP) 45 - 6 Grenoble

Round 25

 4 April, 18:30 — Aurillac 25 - 15 Colomiers
 4 April, 18:30 — Béziers (1 BP) 23 - 26 Bourg-en-Bresse
 4 April, 18:30 — Bordeaux-Bègles 25 - 8 Auch
 4 April, 18:30 — Grenoble 23 - 16 (1 BP) Narbonne
 4 April, 18:30 — La Rochelle (1 BP) 23 - 25 Agen
 4 April, 18:30 — Lyon 25 - 12 Pau
 4 April, 18:30 — Tarbes 20 - 11 Albi
 5 April, 15:15 — Oyonnax 28 - 13 Racing Métro

Rounds 26 to 30
Round 26
 11 April, 18:30 — Auch 6 - 16 Tarbes
 11 April, 18:30 — Béziers 15 - 9 (1 BP) La Rochelle
 11 April, 18:30 — Grenoble (1 BP) 17 - 20 Aurillac
 11 April, 18:30 — Narbonne 6 - 26 Lyon
 11 April, 19:00 — Oyonnax 18 - 17 (1 BP) Bordeaux-Bègles
 12 April, 15:00 — Bourg-en-Bresse 31 - 12 Pau
 12 April, 15:00 — Colomiers 19 - 28 Agen
 12 April, 16:00 — Albi 14 - 26 Racing Métro

Round 27
 18 April, 18:30 — Aurillac 25 - 24 (1 BP) Béziers
 18 April, 18:30 — Colomiers (1 BP) 44 - 16 Bordeaux-Bègles
 18 April, 18:30 — La Rochelle (1 BP) 37 - 16 Narbonne
 18 April, 18:30 — Pau 11 - 3 Albi
 18 April, 18:30 — Racing Métro (1 BP) 35 - 13 Auch
 18 April, 18:30 — Tarbes 24 - 15 Oyonnax
 19 April, 15:00 — Bourg-en-Bresse 19 - 6 Grenoble
 19 April, 15:15 — Agen (1 BP) 25 - 0 Lyon

Round 28
 25 April, 18:30 — Agen 23 - 12 Aurillac
 25 April, 18:30 — Auch (1 BP) 7 - 11 Albi
 25 April, 18:30 — Béziers 35 - 19 Tarbes
 25 April, 18:30 — La Rochelle 23 - 7 Grenoble
 25 April, 18:30 — Lyon (1 BP) 27 - 10 Bourg-en-Bresse
 25 April, 18:30 — Narbonne 21 - 15 (1 BP) Pau
 25 April, 18:30 — Oyonnax 27 - 16 Colomiers
 26 April, 17:30 — Bordeaux-Bègles 12 - 33 (1 BP) Racing Métro

Round 29
 2 May, 18:30 — Albi 30 - 23 (1 BP) Agen
 2 May, 18:30 — Aurillac 37 - 36 (1 BP) Auch
 2 May, 18:30 — Béziers 37 - 18 Narbonne
 2 May, 18:30 — Grenoble 10 - 18 Oyonnax
 2 May, 18:30 — Lyon (1 BP) 30 - 10 Bordeaux-Bègles
 2 May, 18:30 — Racing Métro (1 BP) 48 - 32 Bourg-en-Bresse
 2 May, 18:30 — Tarbes 23 - 22 (1 BP) Pau
 3 May, 14:15 — Colomiers 15 - 29 La Rochelle (1 BP)

Round 30

 17 May, 14:15 — Agen 32 - 17 Racing Métro
 17 May, 14:15 — Albi (1 BP) 24 - 6 Béziers
 17 May, 14:15 — Auch (1 BP) 10 - 12 Lyon
 17 May, 14:15 — Bordeaux-Bègles (1 BP) 19 - 21 Grenoble
 17 May, 14:15 — Bourg-en-Bresse (1 BP) 52 - 27 Colomiers
 17 May, 14:15 — La Rochelle 19 - 13 (1 BP) Tarbes
 17 May, 14:15 — Narbonne 16 - 29 Oyonnax
 17 May, 14:15 — Pau (1 BP) 16 - 19 Aurillac

Promotion playoffs
All times CEST.

Semi-finals

  In the case of a draw at the end of extra-time, the team who has received the fewer red cards goes through. If the number of red cards is the same for both teams, the team that has scored the more tries, then the more penalties qualifies. Albi went through thanks to their 5 penalties to La Rochelle's 4.

Final

See also
 2008–09 Top 14 season

Notes and references

External links
 LNR.fr

2008–09
Pro D2